Varingen is a local newspaper published in Rotnes, Norway. It covers the municipality of Nittedal.

It was established in 1946, and has been independent throughout its existence. It had a circulation of 3,843 in 1983, increasing to the current 6,020, of whom 5,852 are subscribers. It is owned by various local people and groups.

References

Publications established in 1946
Newspapers published in Norway
Mass media in Akershus
Nittedal